This article lists General Elections in the British colony of the Province of New Brunswick from 1784 to its entry into the Canadian Confederation in 1867. Prior to 1784, New Brunswick was Sunbury County, Nova Scotia and it returned members to the Nova Scotia House of Assembly.

For elections after Confederation, see List of New Brunswick general elections (post-Confederation).

List
21st General Election: May–June, 1866. The Government was formed of 33 pro-confederation MLAs, with 8 anti-confederation MLAs forming the opposition.
20th General Election: February–March, 1865
19th General Election: June, 1861
18th General Election: April–May, 1857
17th General Election: June–July, 1856
16th General Election: June, 1854
15th General Election: June–July, 1850
14th General Election: October, 1846
13th General Election: December, 1842-January, 1843
12th General Election: September–October, 1837
11th General Election: December, 1834-January, 1835
10th General Election: October, 1830
9th General Election: June, 1827
8th General Election: June, 1820
7th General Election: October, 1819
6th General Election: August–September, 1816
5th General Election: September–October, 1809
4th General Election: October–November, 1802
3rd General Election: August–September, 1795
2nd General Election: December, 1792-January, 1793
1st General Election: November–December, 1785

References 

1
New Brunswick General Elections (Pre-Confederation)
Elections, General Elections (Post-Confederation)